is a Prefectural Natural Park in western Yamaguchi Prefecture, Japan. Established in 1962, the park is wholly within the municipality of Shimonoseki.

See also
 National Parks of Japan

References

Parks and gardens in Yamaguchi Prefecture
Shimonoseki
Protected areas established in 1962
1962 establishments in Japan